K'allapayuq Urqu (Quechua k'allapa stretcher, yuq a suffix to indicate ownership, urqu mountain, "the mountain with a stretcher", also spelled Callapayoc Orqo, Kallapayuq Orqo) is an archaeological site in the Ayacucho Region in Peru on top of a mountain of the same name. The Chanka site lies in the La Mar Province, Anco District, between the communities of Uskhuqucha (Husjucocha, Osqoqocha, Uscoqocha) and Anchiway (Anchihuay).

References 

Archaeological sites in Peru
Archaeological sites in Ayacucho Region
Mountains of Peru
Mountains of Ayacucho Region